Abdallah ibn Azzuz or Abu Mohammed Abdallah ibn Azzuz al-Kurashi al-Shadhili al-Marrakushi also known as Sidi Balla (died 1789) was a writer from Morocco. He mainly wrote on mysticism, but also on medicine. Ibn Azzuz's Mahab al-kuzuf wa-nafy al-zulumai fi il al-tibb wa l-tabai wa l-hikma, a collection of therapeutic formulae, was especially well-known. His work about medicinal plants, Kashf al-rumuz was equally well-known.

Notes

References
Clifford Edmund Bosworth, The Encyclopaedia of Islam: Supplement, Volume 12, p. 124  (retrieved August 3, 2010)
William Charles Brice, An Historical atlas of Islam, BRILL, 1981, p. 382

Moroccan writers
18th-century Moroccan physicians
Year of birth unknown
1789 deaths
People from Marrakesh